Byers Green is a village in County Durham, in England. It is situated to the north of Bishop Auckland, between Willington and Spennymoor, and a short distance from the River Wear.

Byers Green Hall has been the home of the Trotter family since the 15th century.

Thomas Wright, (1711–1786) a famous 18th-century astronomer, architect and mathematician was born and died here. Wright was educated in King James I Grammar School in Bishop Auckland before being apprenticed to a clockmaker in the town. By 1734, after various adventures, Wright had progressed to making a huge working model of the universe (an orrery) for an aristocratic London patron. This set him on his remarkable career that included the first accurate description of the Milky Way.

Professor Harold Orton, (1898–1975) a noted 20th-century linguist and English dialectologist was also born here. Harold Orton was the son of a schoolmaster at Byers Green and attended King James I Grammar School in Bishop Auckland followed by Merton College, Oxford. His 1933 book The Phonology of a South Durham Dialect, based on the dialect of the area, was re-published by Routledge in 2015.

Sir Percy Cradock, GCMG, (1923–2010) a senior British civil servant, was born in Byers Green. He was educated at Alderman Wraith Grammar School, Spennymoor followed by St John's College, Cambridge, where he read law. Having trained as a barrister Cradock joined the Diplomatic Service and during his career held a number of senior diplomatic posts, including Ambassador to China. Later in his career he was labelled by the media as the 'UK's most senior spy' because he chaired the Joint Intelligence Committee (UK) under Margaret Thatcher's government. Cradock died in London on 22 January 2010, aged 86.

It is not known whether there was a village at Byers Green in the Anglo-Saxon period. The village name is quite late; it was first recorded in 1345 as Bires. It is probably the exact equivalent of the modern word 'byres'. The village name thus means '(the green by the) cowsheds'.

Byers Green remained a farming area throughout the medieval period and into the 16th and 17th century. Most people would have worked on the land.

Transport

From 1840 it became a junction station, between the Clarence and the West Durham Railway towards . Goods were handled at Byers Green until 2 June 1958.

Since the line was lifted in the late 1960s, the station buildings have been demolished, but the site is part of the Auckland County walking system

References

External links

 
Villages in County Durham
Spennymoor